The 1999 European Parliament election in Sweden was the election of MEP representing Sweden constituency for the 1999–2004 term of the European Parliament. It was part of the wider 1999 European election. The vote took place on 13 June.

Results

External links
 European Election News by European Election Law Association (Eurela)

Sweden
European Parliament elections in Sweden
1999 elections in Sweden